The Philippine–American Football League (PAFL) is an American Football league in the Philippines. Organized in 2016, it succeeded the now-defunct Philippine Tackle Football League.

First season
The inaugural season saw the participation of five teams: the Olongapo Warriors, Manila Rough Riders, Manila Datus, Manila Wolfpack, and the Manila Outlaws.  Yaboye Dennis Graves of the Warriors was the Season 1 MVP.

Regular season
The top four teams advance to the semifinal.

Semifinal

Final

Second season
The second season saw the participation of five teams: the Olongapo Warriors, Cavemen, Datu, Juggernauts, and Wolves, the former Wolfpack from PAFL Season 1 now returning with their previous name when they were 2-time champions back in ABP Season 5 and Season 6.

Regular season
The top four teams advance to the semifinal.

Semifinal

Final

Third season
The third season of the PAFL commenced on September 1, 2018. Six teams entered the season: the Cavemen, Datu, Juggernauts, Rebels, Warriors, and the Wolves. ESPN 5 became the official media partner in this season and games were broadcast through the media outfit's YouTube channel. The league followed a single round-robin format with the top four teams advancing to the knockout stage. The four teams play against each other in the semifinals for a berth in the championship game. The Wolves, the #1 seed, defeated the Olongapo Warriors in the semi-finals 63–6. The Wolves beat the Cavemen 37–20 in the championship game. The Wolves now have back to back undefeated championships with a 13-game winning streak.

Regular season

Fourth season
The fourth season title was clinched by the Datus at the Wolves' expense.

League winners and runners-up

Current Teams

References

External links

Official PAFL (Philippine American Football League) Website

Sports leagues established in 2016
2016 establishments in the Philippines
American football leagues
American football in the Philippines